Šatrovački (Serbian Cyrillic: шатровачки) or šatra (Serbian Cyrillic:  шатра) is an argot within the Serbo-Croatian language. Šatrovački was initially developed by various subcultures in Yugoslavia, and became employed as a device of secret communication within various ingroups. Today, it is primarily used among youth as a form of pig Latin. It is more widespread in urban areas, such as capitals Belgrade (Serbia), Zagreb (Croatia) and Sarajevo (Bosnia and Herzegovina).

Usual šatrovački
Words are formed by replacing the syllable order. For example: pivo (beer), becomes vopi. The new word has the same meaning as the original word stem. Since the spelling is nearly phonetic it does not change. However, sometimes one of the vowels is changed to make the new word easier to pronounce, avoid ambiguity, or if the stem word is not in nominative. For example, trava ("grass", marijuana) would become vutra instead of vatra ("fire").

Some words are more commonly spoken in Šatrovački than others, but there is no specific rule. Examples of transformed sentences (although, most of the words in a single sentence are rarely transformed) are:

Brate, neću da igram fudbal. — Tebra, ćune da grami balfud. ("Bro, I don't want to play football.")
Zemun zakon brate. — Munze konza tebra.  (literally: "Zemun is the law, bro" - meaning: "Zemun rules, dude")
Pazi brate, murija! — Zipa tebra, rijamu! ("Watch out mate - cops!", murija slang for police)

Examples 
  -  (Dizelaši, chavs)
  -  (throw; imperative)
  -  (don't; imperative)
  -  (a little, few)
  -  (brother; vocative)
  -  (Gypsy)
  -  (peasant, redneck)
  -  (watch out, pay attention; imperative)
  -  (retard)
  -  (fast food)
  -  (psychopath)
  -  (head, derived from accusative)
  -  (slut)
  -  (weed, marijuana)
  -  (coffee)
  -  (drugs)
  -  (beer)
  -  (beans)
  -  (hello)
  -  (stinks)
  -  (say, speak; imperative)
  -  (law, great, excellent)
  -  (soccer)
  -  (device, spliff)
  -  (cunny, pretty girl, usually pejorative)
  -  (cops, pejorative)
  -  (suck; imperative)
  -  (hypocorism, usually vocative)
  -  (hypocorism, usually vocative)
  -  (hypocorism)
  - 
  -  (Block rules)
  -  (Zemun rules)
  -  (gold)
  - (asshole)
  - (dick, penis)
  - (cunt, pussy)
  - (husband)
  -
  - (no shit, cut the crap; imperative)
  - (pig)
   - (smoke, blow; imperative)

Utrovački

Utrovački (Утровачки) is a more complex form of šatrovački. Words are formed using: U + last part + ZA + first part + NJE. E.g. vikipedija (Wikipedia) becomes ukipedijazavinje. Today, utrovački is not widely used.

Alternative Utrovački is same as above, but without "ZA", e.g. pivo (beer) becomes uvopinje, or cigare (cigarettes) becomes ugarecinje.

Syllable omission

A more simplified version of šatrovački is using only parts of the word, while excluding the first syllable, and is most commonly used among young people in Serbia. For example, koncert (concert) would be shortened to cert. The rules of creating a new word that can be used in nominative while the stem is not apply similarly to standard šatrovački. An example of a full sentence would be:

  (My friend and I are going to a concert on the Fortress)
 

This is particularly characteristic of Novi Sad youth subculture, and is very rarely spoken outside of Vojvodina.

Common examples
  -  (music)
  -  (concert)
  -  (fortress, almost exclusively refers to Petrovaradin fortress in Novi Sad)
  -  (friend)
  -  (news stand)
  -  (diminutive of juice)
  -  (station)
  -  (shirt)
  -  (trousers)
  -  (sneakers)
  -  (Diminutive for Vinjak, an alcoholic drink similar to Cognac)
  -  (box)
  -  (ashtray)
  -  (thousand)
  -  (small bag)
  -  (cunt, pussy)
  -  (printer)
  -  (crêpe, pancake)
  -  (drug dealer, usually of marijuana)
  -  (package or anything packed or wrapped)
  -  (usually refers to Pizza capricciosa, but can be used for any kind of pizza)

Adding syllables

A very rare but present form of expression found in the Belgrade projects (blokovi). Words are reconstructed by adding various suffixes so that the original word remains relatively intact. Usually, the basis is šatrovački. The resulting words have a generally diminutive meaning.

Examples

 kajblo or kićblo - blok (Blok of suburb Blokovi or New Belgrade)
 kićso or kajso - sok (juice)
 pajdo - dop (heroin)

These diminutives can later be combined using the Šatrovački method, resulting in words like kajblo, or kićblo. It is hard to locate the origin of this version of the urban dialect, but it is found in neighbourhoods of Karaburma, Zemun and New Belgrade.

Also there is another type of šatrovački, where the words are reconstructed by addition of letter P followed by the vowel preceding the inserted P after each syllable. In Macedonia, this type of speech is called papagalski (parrot speech). Since syllables, usually, end on a vowel that vowel is repeated after the inserted P as follows: 

šapatropovapačkipi (ša+pa-tro+po-va+pa-čki+pi)

Examples

 dipizepel - dizel (diesel)
 bapacipi - baci (throw)
 nepemopoj - nemoj (don't)
 mapalopo - malo (some)
 brapatepe - brate (brother)
 cipigapan - cigan (gypsy)
 pepedeper - peder (homosexual)
 sepeljapak - seljak (peasant)
 papazipi - pazi (pay attention)
 krepetepen - kreten (idiot)

See also
 Banjački, secret language in former Yugoslavia
 Meshterski, secret language in Bulgaria
 Back slang
 Pig Latin
 Verlan

References

External links
 Vukajlija slang dictionary
 Žargonaut - Croatian slang dictionary

Cant languages
Language games
Slang
Serbian language
Croatian language